Kfar Uria is a moshav in central Israel. Located near Beit Shemesh in the Shephelah. It falls under the jurisdiction of Mateh Yehuda Regional Council.

History
The village was first established in 1912 on land purchased by the Palestine Office (Palaestinaamt). It was named after the Arab village of Kafrûria, an "abandoned or sparsely populated" estate situated about half a kilometer west of the new settlement. These lands were to serve as an agricultural training place. Among the village's early founders and residents was A. D. Gordon.

According to a census conducted in 1922 by the British Mandate authorities, Kfar Uria had a population of 40 Jews. The census in 1931 recorded 10 Muslim inhabitants living in 2 houses.

In the 1929 Palestine riots Arab rioters from Jerusalem attacked Kfar Uria, with some local help, robbed and burned down the village. The inhabitants of the adjacent Arab villages for the most part were on good terms with the village's residents and many treated the moshav's association director, Baruch Yakimovsky, as their mukhtar (village chief). He was on amicable terms with mukhtars in surrounding villages. The farmers of the area, both Jews and Arabs, cooperated and defended each other against raiding nomadic Bedouin. 

Six Jewish families who had stayed behind were later smuggled out by the mukhtar of Beit Far via one of the ancient natural tunnels that crisscrosses the area. Yakimovsky managed, with the cooperation of some local mukhtars to work Kfar Uria's land for a few more years. In 1944, Jewish stonecutters from Kurdistan rebuilt the village on the ruins of the original site, around 1.5 km north-west Khirbat Ism Allah, but not on village land.

The new village was attacked on 11 January 1948, but repelled by a combination of a Palmach force and an armoured British unit. Haganah guards murdered without provocation an Arab peasant couple near the village soon after, in February of that year. A third attempt to settle the area was undertaken in 1949, when a moshav was established on the site. The village name is similar to that of Khirbet Cafarorie, a ruin located south - west of the village, which had a rock-hewn winepress, a mosaic and burial caves. 

The village center features an old Khan, which once hosted the agricultural training workers, including A. D. Gordon. The Khan structure remains to this day at the heart of the community, but it requires renovations and therefore closed to visitors. 

Between 2009 and 2011 a new neighborhood was built and populated with 69 new houses and families.

In 2013, an archaeological survey was conducted at the site by Irina Zilberbod on behalf of the Israel Antiquities Authority (IAA).

Landmarks
In 1970, Israeli artist Avraham Ofek created a mural for the community center at Kfar Uria. The mural, which covers three walls, each 12.5 meters long and three meters high, tells the story of Israel focusing on the themes of immigration, building the country, and family and Jewish tradition.

See also
Israeli art

References

Moshavim
Populated places established in 1912
Populated places established in 1944
Populated places established in 1949
Populated places in Jerusalem District
1912 establishments in the Ottoman Empire
1929 Palestine riots
Polish-Jewish culture in Israel